Yip Ho Nung , also known as Harry Yip, (18 October 1909 – 6 October 1979) was an Australian Chinese community leader, general merchant, produce merchant and restaurateur. Yip Ho Nung  was born in Chien Mei village, Dongguan, Canton (Guangdong) Province, China and died in Darlinghurst, New South Wales.

References

Australian restaurateurs
Chinese emigrants to Australia
1909 births
1979 deaths
Burials at Rookwood Cemetery